Teasing Nature is the second full-length studio album by Israeli alternative/progressive rock band Eatliz, released on December 19, 2010.

The album has been described as being very experimental in comparison to the band's earlier work, ditching the heavy metal elements which were very dominant on past releases, in favor of more electronic elements, and more use of synthesizers and keyboards, collaborating with the likes of Tamir Muskat of Balkan Beat Box and Omri Behr. Bands that influenced the album's sound include Portishead and Sonic Youth.

In January 2011, the album's release was celebrated with 3 special release shows: on January 5, at the Barby club in Tel Aviv, on January 13, at the Yellow Submarine in Jerusalem, and on January 22, at the Beat club in Haifa. This was followed by a North American tour in March, and a European tour in April.

The album was released in two editions: a single CD edition, and a deluxe digipack edition that includes the album and an additional DVD which features a full live show by the band, which sees the band playing material from all of their career, including the new album.

Track listing

Deluxe DVD track listing

Personnel
Lee Triffon – lead vocals
Guy Ben Shetrit – guitar, vocals
Amit Erez – guitar, vocals
Or Bahir – guitar
Hadar Green – bass, vocals
Omry Hanegby – drums, percussion

Additional personnel
Tamir Muskat – electronics, programming, mixing
Omri Behr – keyboards, electronics

References

2010 albums
Eatliz albums